The President's Volunteer Service Award is a civil award bestowed by the President of the United States. Established by executive order by George W. Bush, the award was established to honor volunteers that give hundreds of hours per year helping others through the President's Council on Service and Civic Participation.  The award can be granted to individuals, families and organizations located throughout the United States. Depending on the amount of service hours completed, individuals can receive the Bronze, Silver, Gold, and/or the President's Call to Service Award (also referred to the President's Lifetime Achievement Award). The Call to Service Award is the most prestigious, and it has been awarded to few Americans to recognize over 4,000 hours of extraordinary service including notable honorees such as S. Truett Cathy, Mark Carman, and Zach Bonner. Awardees may receive a personalized certificate, an official pin, medallion, and/or a congratulatory letter from the President depending on the award earned.

Purpose and establishment
The purpose for the President's Volunteer Service Award is to honor the hundreds of thousands of people across America that have volunteered hundreds, if not thousands of volunteer hours over their lifetime. The program was established to honor the volunteer works of individuals, families and organizations throughout the United States.  There have been several variations of this program using different names, including the President's Volunteer Action Award from the 1980s.

The current program is called the President's Volunteer Service Award and was created by President George W. Bush in 2002.  He made this program known during his State of the Union address. 

In January 2003, President George W. Bush created an executive order that created the President's Council on Service and Civic Participation.  The council was established to recognize the important contributions Americans of all ages are making within their communities through service and civic engagement. 

The President's Volunteer Service Award is now an initiative of the Corporation for National and Community Service and the Points of Light Institute.

The program has two award types (individual and family) and four award levels (Bronze, Silver, Gold and Lifetime Achievement), with required hours varying by age range of the recipient for the Bronze, Silver, and Gold level awards.  The Lifetime Achievement award requires a minimum of 4,000 hours of documented volunteer service.  

During late 2019 and much of 2020, the Lifetime Award was "under review".  Volunteers who reached the required 4,000 hours of service were unable to receive the Lifetime Achievement award during that time.  In 2021, the Lifetime Achievement Award was made available again, and the President Biden-issued congratulatory letter became available.

After 9/11
After September 11, 2001, President Bush saw the need to renew the interest in helping one's neighbors and called upon all Americans to help by volunteering their time.  As part of this request, he created several new programs, including the Citizen Corps, and the President's Volunteer Service Award to be given to those that help to make a difference.

Tracking hours
Volunteers are requested to maintain a log of hours that are volunteered and when requesting a President's Volunteer Service Award are required to present this information for certification.  As of 2019, individuals must track their volunteer hours without the benefit of the PVSA website. While the President's Volunteer Service Award website for years offered the hours-of-service tracking to individuals and groups who had registered on the PVSA website, that functionality was removed in 2019.  In late August 2019, the program announced that individual volunteers who had been previously tracked their hours on the PVSA website would be able to download a historical record of their hours.

See also

List of volunteer awards

References

External links
 

Humanitarian and service awards
Civil awards and decorations of the United States
Awards established in 2003
2003 establishments in the United States